Greetings and Kisses from Tegernsee (German: Gruß und Kuß vom Tegernsee) is a 1957 West German musical romantic comedy film directed by Rudolf Schündler and starring Elma Karlowa, Bert Fortell and Christiane Maybach. It was part of a large number of heimatfilm produced during the decade. It was shot at the Bavaria Studios in Munich and on location around Tegernsee. The film's sets were designed by the art directors Willi Herrmann and Heinrich Weidemann.

Synopsis
An American daughter of a millionaire hotelier is due to go to finishing school at Bad Wiessee on Lake Tegernsee but wants to head to Paris to meet up with her boyfriend Billy so she hires Lissy, a music student, to take her place. She succeeds in the impersonation and falls in love with Max, the nephew of the headteacher. Complications ensue when Billy arrives, and having completely forgotten his American girlfriend, falls for Steffi who runs a kiosk.

Cast
 Elma Karlowa as 	Lissy
 Bert Fortell as	Max
 Christiane Maybach as 	Steffi
 Harald Juhnke as 	Billy
 Ruth Stephan as 	Dorothea
 Kurt Großkurth as 	Amandus
 Monika Dahlberg as 	Pat
 Lale Andersen as 	Self - Musician
 Ingrid Dittmar as 	Elena
 Hansen-Quartett as 	Singer 	
 Hans Leibelt as Mr. Hoover
 Harald Martens as 	Pips
 Franz Schafheitlin as 	Büroleiter
 Kenneth Spencer as 	Jimmy
 Jan Troeger as Junger Franzose

References

Bibliography 
 Ludewig, Alexandra. Screening Nostalgia: 100 Years of German Heimat Film. transcript Verlag, 2014.
 Von Moltke, Johannes. No Place Like Home: Locations Of Heimat In German Cinema. University of California Press, 2005.

External links 
 

1957 films
West German films
German comedy films
1957 comedy films
1950s German-language films
Films directed by Werner Klingler
Films shot at Bavaria Studios
Films shot in Bavaria
Films set in Bavaria
Constantin Film films
1950s German films